Louis VIII (5 September 1187 – 8 November 1226), nicknamed The Lion, was King of France from 1223 to 1226. As prince, he invaded England on 21 May 1216 and was excommunicated by a papal legate on 29 May 1216. On 2 June 1216, Louis was proclaimed "King of England" by rebellious barons in London, though never crowned. He soon seized half the English kingdom but was eventually defeated by the English and after the Treaty of Lambeth, was paid 10,000 marks, pledged never to invade England again, and was absolved of his excommunication. 

Louis, as prince and fulfilling his father's crusading vow, led forces during the Albigensian Crusade in support of Simon de Montfort the Elder, from 1219 to 1223, and as king, from January 1226 to September 1226. Crowned king in 1223, Louis' ordinance against Jewish usury, a reversal of his father's policies, led to the establishment of Lombard moneylenders in Paris.

Louis' campaigns in 1224 and 1226 against the Angevin Empire gained him Poitou, Saintonge, Périgord and Angoumois as well as numerous cities in Languedoc, thus leaving the Angevin Kings of England with Gascony as their only remaining continental possession. Louis died in November 1226 from dysentery, while returning from the Albigensian Crusade, and was succeeded by his son Louis IX.

Prince Louis

Early years
Born 5 September 1187, Louis was the son of Philip II of France and Isabelle of Hainaut. His mother died in 1190, but Louis was not formally invested as Count of Artois. Instead his father allowed him a nominal control over the county to learn about governance. In summer 1195, a marriage between Louis and Eleanor of Brittany, niece of Richard I of England, was suggested for an alliance between Philip II and Richard, but it failed.

On 23 May 1200, Louis was married to Blanche of Castile, daughter of King Alfonso VIII of Castile and Eleanor of England. The marriage could only be concluded after prolonged negotiations between King Philip II of France and Blanche's uncle John, King of England.

Campaign of 1214
In 1213, Louis occupied two towns in Flanders, St. Omer and Aire, which led to animosity between Louis' father, Philip II, and Count Renaud of Boulogne. By 1214, Philip II of France, was facing an alliance consisting of King John of England, Emperor Otto IV, Count Renaud of Boulogne and Count Ferdinand of Flanders. Facing a two front war, the first attack coming from Flanders led by Otto, Renaud and Ferdinand, supported by the Earl of Salisbury would march south-west, while the other attack from Poitou, under John, would march north-east towards Paris.

Louis was given command of the front against John in Poitou. The first part of the campaign went well for the English, Louis being outmanuevered by John, and losing the city of Angers by the end of June.  When John besieged the castle of Roche-au-Moine, a key stronghold, Louis was forced give battle against John's army. When faced against Louis' forces, the local Poitevin nobles refused to advance with the king; left at something of a disadvantage, John retreated back to La Rochelle. Shortly afterwards, Philip won the hard-fought Battle of Bouvines in the north against Otto and John's other allies, bringing an end to John's hopes of retaking Normandy.

Albigensian crusade as Prince
In April 1215, Louis, fulfilling his father's vow to crusade against the Albigensians, was cautioned by a papal legate not to impede the crusade. At Narbonne, Louis ordered the destruction of the town's fortifications in response to the disagreement between Simon de Montfort and Arnaud Amaury, and forced the viscount and other authorities to swear loyalty to Simon. While at Toulouse, he ordered the city officials to tear down their walls, fill in their moat, and to accept Simon de Montfort as the head of their government. Louis' involvement in the crusade favored Simon de Montfort at every turn.

Pretender to the English throne

In 1215, the English barons rebelled against the unpopular King John in the First Barons' War. The barons, seeing Louis' wife as a descendant of Henry II of England, offered the throne to him. While Louis prepared an army to press his claim to the English throne, a new papal legate, Cardinal Guala Bicchieri, who was traveling through France to England, explicitly condemned Louis' plan.

Louis landed unopposed on the Isle of Thanet in eastern Kent, England, at the head of an army on 21 May 1216. There was little resistance when the prince entered London, and he was proclaimed King Louis I of England at Old St Paul's Cathedral with great pomp and celebration in the presence of all of London. Even though he was not crowned, many nobles, as well as King Alexander II of Scotland on behalf of his English possessions, gathered to give homage. At Winchester on 29 May 1216, Cardinal Bicchieri excommunicated Louis and all his followers.

On 14 June 1216, Louis captured Winchester and soon controlled over half of the English kingdom. King John's death in October 1216 caused many of the rebellious barons to desert Louis in favour of John's nine-year-old son, Henry III. Louis, undeterred by Henry's reissuing of the Magna Carta, besieged and invested the castle of Hertford in December 1216. By 20 December 1216, he received a proposal for a truce, from regent William Marshal, 1st Earl of Pembroke, lasting from Christmas until 13 January. Louis accepted these terms and traveled back to London, on the way threatening to burn the abbey at St. Albans for the abbot's refusal to recognize him as King of England.

After his army was beaten at the Battle of Lincoln on 20 May 1217 and his naval forces were defeated at the Battle of Sandwich on 24 August 1217, Louis was forced to make peace on English terms. The principal provisions of the Treaty of Lambeth were an amnesty for English rebels, a pledge from Louis not to attack England again, and 10,000 marks to be given to Louis. In return Louis' excommunication was lifted.

King Louis VIII

Louis succeeded his father on 14 July 1223; his coronation took place on 6 August of the same year in the cathedral at Reims. He gained the county of Toulouse after Amalric of Montfort ceded his claim in 1224. As King, he continued to seek revenge on the Angevins, seizing Poitou (in 1224) and Saintonge. While his campaign in 1226 captured numerous cities in Languedoc.

Policy on Jews
On 1 November 1223, Louis issued an ordinance that prohibited his officials from recording debts owed to Jews, thus reversing the policies set by his father Philip II Augustus. This removed any type of assistance for the Jews from the king or barons. Further, Christians would be required to repay only the principal of any loans owed to Jews. This caused a major impact on Jewish moneylenders and affected France so much that in 1225 Louis invited Lombard moneylenders to Paris.

Albigensian crusade as King

In 1223, Louis received a letter from Pope Honorius III, entreating him to move against the Albigensians. In early 1226, following the excommunication of Raymond VII of Toulouse at the Council of Bourges and the promise of a tenth of clerical incomes towards the next crusade, Louis took the cross, stating his intention to crusade against the Albigensians. 

In May 1226, Louis assembled his army at Bourges and moving quickly captured the towns of Béziers, Carcassonne, Beaucaire, and Marseille. However, Avignon resisted, refusing to open its gates to the French troops. Not wanting to storm the city, Louis settled in for a siege. A frontal assault that August was fiercely beaten back. On 9 September 1226, the town surrendered, agreeing to pay 6,000 marks, handing over hostages, and destroying its walls. However, Louis' army took heavy losses besieging Avignon. Finally arriving at Toulouse in October 1226, it was apparent his army was too tired and too weak to attack. Louis chose to return to Paris with the plan to attack Raymond VII of Toulouse next season.

Death
While returning to Paris, King Louis VIII became ill with dysentery, and died on 8 November 1226 in the Château de Montpensier, Auvergne.

The Saint Denis Basilica, just to the north of Paris, houses the tomb of Louis VIII. His son, Louis IX (1226–70), succeeded him on the throne. Queen Blanche concluded the crusade in the south in 1229.

Marriage and issue
On 23 May 1200, Louis married Blanche of Castile (4 March 1188 – 26 November 1252). They had:
 Blanche (1205, died shortly after birth).
 Philip (9 September 1209 – 30 June 1218), betrothed in July 1215 to Agnes of Donzy, who later wed Guy II of Saint-Pol.
 Alphonse (26 January 1213, died shortly after birth), twin of John.
 John (26 January 1213, died shortly after birth), twin of Alphonse.
 Louis (Poissy, 25 April 1214 – 25 August 1270, Tunis), King of France as successor to his father.
 Robert (25 September 1216 – 9 February 1250, killed in battle, Mansoura, Egypt), Count of Artois
 Philip (20 February 1218 – 1220)
 John Tristan (21 July 1219 – 1232), Count of Anjou and Maine, betrothed in March 1227 to Yolande of Brittany.
 Alphonse (Poissy, 11 November 1220 – 21 August 1271, Corneto), Count of Poitou and Auvergne, and by marriage, of Toulouse
 Philip Dagobert (20 February 1222 – 1232)
 Isabelle (16 March 1224 – 23 February 1270)
 Stephen (31 December 1225 – 21 March 1227)
 Charles (posthumously 21 March 1227 – 7 January 1285), Count of Anjou and Maine, by marriage Count of Provence and Forcalquier

Notes

References

Sources

Further reading
 
 Hanley, Catherine. (2016) Louis: The French Prince Who Invaded England (New Haven: Yale University Press) 
 McGlynn, Sean. (2014) Blood Cries Afar: The Magna Carta War and the Invasion of England 1215-1217

External links

|-

 
1187 births
1226 deaths
Nobility from Paris
People of the Albigensian Crusade
House of Capet
Counts of Artois
Male Shakespearean characters
Pretenders to the English throne
12th-century French people
13th-century French people
13th-century English monarchs
13th-century kings of France
Deaths from dysentery
Burials at the Basilica of Saint-Denis
Children of Philip II of France